790 (seven hundred [and] ninety) is the natural number following 789 and preceding 791.

Mathematical properties
790 is:

a sphenic number.
a nontotient.
a Harshad number in bases 2, 7, 14 and 16.
an aspiring number.
the aliquot sum of 1574. The aliquot sequence starting at 3142 is: 3142, 1574, 790, 650, 652, 496, 496...

Other fields 
 790 (pronounced "seven-ninety") is a fictional talking robot head from the science-fiction television series LEXX.

References

Integers